Chiaki Takahashi may refer to:

, Japanese voice actress
, Japanese politician